The 2022 Spain Women's Pentangular Series was a women's Twenty20 International (WT20I) cricket tournament held in Spain from 11 to 14 November 2022. The participants were the women's national sides of Spain, Italy, Norway, Sweden and Isle of Man. The Isle of Man played their first official WT20I matches in the tournament.

Squads

Points table

Fixtures

References

External links
 Series home at ESPNcricinfo

Cricket in Spain
2022 in women's cricket
Associate international cricket competitions in 2022–23
Spain Women's Pentangular Series